Giuseppina is an Italian feminine given name. It is the Italian version of the English name Josephine.

Variations
Feminine: Giuseppa, Geppa, Geppina, Beppa, Beppina, Peppa, Peppina, Pina, Pinella, Pinetta, Pinuccia, Giusi, Giusy.
Masculine: Giuseppe.

People
Giuseppina Bersani (born 1949), Italian fencer
Giuseppa Bolognara Calcagno (1826–1884), Italian revolutionary
Giuseppina Bozzacchi (1853–1870), Italian ballerina
Giuseppina Cirulli (born 1959), Italian hurdler
Giuseppina Finzi-Magrini (1878–1944), Italian soprano
Giuseppina Grassini (1773–1850), Italian contralto
Giuseppina Huguet (1871–1951), Spanish soprano
Giuseppina Leone (born 1934), Italian athlete
Giuseppina Morlacchi (1846–1886), Italian-American ballerina
Giuseppina Pasqua (1855–1930), Italian opera singer
Giuseppina Ronzi de Begnis (1800–1853), Italian soprano
Giuseppina Strepponi (1815–1897), Italian soprano
Giuseppina Tuissi (1923–1945), Italian resistance member
Giuseppina Vadalà (1824–1914), Italian revolutionary

See also
Giuseppina, 1960 British documentary film
6533 Giuseppina, main-belt asteroid

Italian feminine given names